Stefon may refer to:

 Stefon Meyers, a character played by Bill Hader on SNL
 Stefon Adams, American former NFL player
 Stefon Alexander, American rapper that goes by the name P.O.S.
 Stefon Bristol, American film director
 Stefon Diggs, American NFL player
 Stefon Harris, American jazz vibraphonist
 Stefon Jackson, American former basketball player